Pennsylvania Line was a line infantry from Pennsylvania during the American Revolutionary War.

Pennsylvania Line may also refer to:

 Penn Line, a commuter train line in Maryland
 Penn Line Manufacturing
 Frederick and Pennsylvania Line Railroad Company

See also 
 Pennsylvania Avenue Line (disambiguation)
 Philadelphia Main Line (PA Main Line), a collection of suburbs of Philadelphia